Ichikoh Industries, Ltd.  is a Japanese automotive parts manufacturer which mainly produces light and mirrors. It is known for its development of electric wing mirrors (seen, for instance, on the C32 Nissan Laurel).

In 2007, it established a plant in Foshan, China as a joint venture with French auto part makers Valeo. The plant became a subsidiary of Valeo in 2017.

References

Auto parts suppliers of Japan
Japanese brands
Manufacturing companies established in 1939
Japanese companies established in 1939